K. V. Subba Reddy is an Indian politician who was an Indian National Congress Member of the Legislative Assembly of Andhra Pradesh from Nellore constituency from 1978 to 1983 and 1985 to 1989.

References

Possibly living people
Indian National Congress politicians from Andhra Pradesh
Year of birth missing
People from Nellore district
Telugu politicians
Telangana politicians